Torfkuhlen Bad Sülze is a group of three lakes at Bad Sülze in Vorpommern-Rügen, Mecklenburg-Vorpommern, Germany. At an elevation of 1.8 m, its surface area is 0.27 km².

External links

Lakes of Mecklenburg-Western Pomerania
LTorfkuhlenBadSulze
Vorpommern-Rügen